Roberto Maidana (July 1, 1928 – August 11, 2007) was an Argentine journalist.

During his long career he interviewed a number of high-profile personalities, including John and Robert Kennedy, Pandit Nehru, Golda Meir, Yitzhak Rabin, Fidel Castro, Anwar el-Sadat, Ernesto Guevara, Moshe Dayan, Henry Kissinger, Indira Gandhi, Menachem Begin, Federico Fellini, Vittorio Gassman, Jorge Luis Borges, Juan Rulfo, Jorge Amado, Luis Federico Leloir, Bernardo Houssay, Wernher von Braun, Pelé, Cassius Clay and Juan Manuel Fangio.

Argentine journalists
Male journalists
1928 births
2007 deaths
20th-century journalists